The 1985 Cornell Big Red football team was an American football team that represented Cornell University during the 1985 NCAA Division I-AA football season. Cornell finished second-to-last in the Ivy League. 

In its third season under head coach Maxie Baughan, the team compiled a 3–7 record and was outscored 178 to 157. Stuart Mitchell, John Tagliaferri and Dave Van Metre were the team captains. The second win of the year, at Yale on November 9, was the 500th victory in the history of Cornell football.

Cornell's 2–5 conference record placed seventh in the Ivy League standings. The Big Red outscored Ivy opponents 127 to 108. 

Cornell played its home games at Schoellkopf Field in Ithaca, New York.

Schedule

References

Cornell
Cornell Big Red football seasons
Cornell Big Red football